The 1957 Connecticut Huskies football team represented the University of Connecticut in the 1957 NCAA College Division football season.  The Huskies were led by sixth-year head coach Bob Ingalls, and completed the season with a record of 5–4–1.

Schedule

References

Connecticut
UConn Huskies football seasons
Yankee Conference football champion seasons
Connecticut Huskies football